Maximilian Reule (born 1 February 1994) is a German footballer who plays as a goalkeeper for Sonnenhof Großaspach.

Career
Reule played at FV Wildbad and FC Germania Brötzingen as a youth player and then joined the youth department of Karlsruher SC. In 2012, he was promoted to the professional squad, but only made appearances for the reserve team. In 2014, Reule moved to Chemnitzer FC as their new backup goalkeeper and signed a contract until 30 June 2015, with an option for an extra year. On 1 November 2014, he made his professional debut against SV Wehen Wiesbaden, but after making five appearances, Philipp Pentke replaced him in the starting lineup. After the 2014–15 season, Reule signed a two-year contract with SV Wehen Wiesbaden. There, too, he could not beat out first goalkeeper, Markus Kolke, in competition, and was only utilised in four league matches in November to December 2016, as Kolke had suffered an injury.

For the 2017–18 season, Reule moved to league rivals SG Sonnenhof Großaspach, where he was used as a backup for Kevin Broll, but made appearances in the DFB Pokal. After Broll moved to Dynamo Dresden in 2019, Reule took over as the starting goalkeeper for Sonnenhof Großaspach.

References

1994 births
People from Neuenbürg
Sportspeople from Karlsruhe (region)
Footballers from Baden-Württemberg
Living people
German footballers
Association football goalkeepers
Karlsruher SC II players
Karlsruher SC players
Chemnitzer FC players
SV Wehen Wiesbaden players
SG Sonnenhof Großaspach players
SSV Ulm 1846 players
Regionalliga players
3. Liga players
Oberliga (football) players